The 2nd Cavalry Corps was a cavalry corps in the Imperial Russian Army.

Part of
9th Army: 1915
7th Army: 1916–1917
8th Army: 1917

Commanders
Lieutenant General Huseyn Khan Nakhchivanski: 1914–1915
Lieutenant General Georgy Ottonovich Rauch: 1915
Lieutenant General Grand Duke Michael Alexandrovich of Russia: 1916–1917
Lieutenant General W. H. Roop: 1917
Lieutenant General K. A. Tumanov: 1917

References

Corps of the Russian Empire